Michael McCann (born March 28, 1976) is an American attorney, professor and sports journalist. McCann is the director of the Sports and Entertainment Law Institute at the University of New Hampshire School of Law. He is also a regular contributor to Sports Illustrated on sports-related legal issues.

Early career

McCann was admitted to the Massachusetts Bar in 2002. He served as legal counsel to Rep. Marty Meehan of Massachusetts and as a communications aide to Massachusetts Attorney General Thomas Reilly.

In 2004 McCann represented former Ohio State running back Maurice Clarett in his attempt to  enter the NFL Draft. Although Clarett initially won his case, the decision was overturned by the United States Court of Appeals for the Second Circuit. Clarett ultimately participated in the NFL Draft the following year.

Academics

Prior to joining the University of New Hampshire School of Law faculty, McCann taught at Mississippi College School of Law, Yale Law School, Boston College Law School and Vermont Law School. At Yale McCann oversaw a sports law and analytics reading group, the first course of its kind offered at any law school. He also co-founded The Project on Law and Mind Sciences at Harvard Law School. In 2015, McCann taught a course on the Deflategate scandal at UNH.

McCann has authored over 15 articles for nationally-recognized law review journals, including the Yale Law Journal, Wisconsin Law Review, and Boston College Law Review. In 2008 he chaired the section on law and sports for the Association of American Law Schools. McCann is also the editor and co-author of The Oxford Handbook of American Sports Law, as well as co-author of the book Court Justice: The Inside Story of My Battle Against the NCAA with Ed O'Bannon.

Sports journalism

McCann has written several hundred columns for Sports Illustrated and its online edition, SI.com, since joining its staff in 2007. At Sports Illustrated in 2012, McCann was instrumental in exposing former Arkansas football coach Bobby Petrino's hiring of his mistress as a player development coordinator. McCann was the first journalist to interview Lance Armstrong after the disgraced cyclist publicly admitted to doping during a January 2013 television program hosted by Oprah Winfrey. McCann also wrote extensively on the 2011-12 Penn State child sex abuse scandal.

McCann serves as a legal analyst for NBA TV. In November 2012 he was cited by The Huffington Post as a "must-follow Twitter account for NBA fanatics.". Since June 2020, McCann has been a legal analyst and writer for Sportico.

References

1976 births
Georgetown University alumni
Harvard Law School alumni
Living people
Massachusetts lawyers
People from Lawrence, Massachusetts
Sportswriters from Massachusetts
University of New Hampshire faculty
University of Virginia School of Law alumni
Mississippi College School of Law faculty